Thondaimandala Vellalar is a high-ranking subcaste of the Vellalar caste in the state of Tamil Nadu, India who tend,  to adopt the title of Mudaliar and they have been traditional "landlords, warriors, and officials of the state class" described by the anthropologist Kathleen Gough.

Susan Neild notes the Kondaikatti Vellalar, Thondai Mandala Aadhi Saiva Vellalar and Thuluva Vellalars  as being the "predominant" subcastes of the Thondamandala Vellala.They practice endogamy and have a least two subgroups themselves, being the higher-status Melnadu and the lower-ranked Kilnadu.

According to Burton Stein the Thondaimandala Vellalar appeared to be linked to the Morasu Vokkaligas of Bangalore and Kolar.

In her study concentrated on two villages in 1951-53, Kathleen Gough noted the Thondamandala Vellala subjects there to have been traditionally "landlords, warriors, and officials of the state class". She thought it likely that they had moved to their present area in Thanjavur around the 15th century when the Vijayanagaras were making incursions on their former heartland of Kanchipuram in the Pallava country. She noted those households studied as being the highest-ranked members of the village community after the Brahmins, and possibly to have in some cases increased their wealth and land by being appointed as revenue collectors for the Kingdom of Mysore when it took over the area in the period after 1780.

References 
Notes

Citations

Bibliography

Vellalar
Social groups of Tamil Nadu